Bunostomum is a genus of nematodes of the small intestine of ruminants and camelids. Important species include: B. phlebotomum in calves and B. trigonocephalum in lambs. The worms are stout and measure  in length. Young animals are most commonly affected and only several hundred worms are necessary to cause morbidity. Adults often carry worms without showing clinical signs.

Life cycle
The life cycle is direct, with a prepatent period of 30-56 days. Eggs hatch on the ground and develop into infective larvae in several weeks. Larvae penetrate through the skin or are ingested and then migrate to the respiratory system, are coughed up and swallowed and finally reach the small intestine. Eggs are then shed in the feces of the infected host.

Clinical signs and diagnosis 
Diarrhoea is the primary sign, along with systemic signs of anorexia, lethargy and weight loss if the worm burden is severe. Hypoproteinaemia, anaemia and dehydration often occur. Skin involvement due to larvae penetration appears as lesions especially on the feet and limbs. Analysis of faecal samples enables eggs to be found, or adults are visualised in the small intestine at necropsy.

Treatment and control 
All available anthelmintics are efficient at treating the infection. Prophylactic anthelmintic treatment may help prevent the disease, as well as pasture management to avoid egg and larvae accumulation.

References 

Bunostomum reviewed and published by Wikivet accessed 09/10/2011.

Strongylida
Veterinary parasitology
Parasitic nematodes of mammals
Rhabditida genera